Unite Us All is a four-track EP by Christian metal band Point Zero, now known as War of Ages. It features guest vocals by Stone (of the band Anne Gohra) and Joel Quiggle, with album artwork by Death Squad Design. After this EP the band renamed themselves to avoid lawsuits by corporate companies.

Track listing 
"My Solitude" - (3:31)
"False Prophet" - (4:20)
"Broken Before You" - (3:51)
"Two Days" - (4:33)

War of Ages 
Credits adapted from Herbmusic.
 Leroy Hamp - lead vocals
 Steve Brown - lead guitar, backing vocals
 Matt Moore - rhythm guitar
 Nate Owensby - bass guitar, triangle
 Rob Kerner - drums

References

War of Ages albums
2004 EPs